The Fokker F.25 Promotor, first flown in 1946, was a single-engined, twin-boomed, four-seat passenger monoplane with a pusher engine mounted at the rear of a central nacelle. It was of wooden construction and has fitted with a retractable nosewheel undercarriage. One feature of the design was that instead of a 2 + 2 seating, the pilot sat in front to the left, and all three passengers were on a bench seat to the rear of him. Alternatively, when being used as an air ambulance aircraft, it could carry a patient on a stretcher, which was loaded through a hatch in the aircraft's nose. The F.25 was evocative of the pre-war G.I design. 

During World War II, Frits Diepen, a car dealer, had a twin boom aircraft powered by a  Ford V-8 engine designed and built at Bergen-op-Zoom. This aircraft emerged postwar as the Diepen Difoga 421 aircraft, and was flown for the first time in 1946, but proved unsuccessful. 

Diepen then contracted Fokker to design and build a new aircraft of similar layout to the Difoga, which became the Fokker F.25 Promotor. Diepen intended to use the Promotor as an air taxi and charter aircraft, placing an order for 100 aircraft, and also negotiated exclusive sales rights to the Promotor. The first example made its maiden flight on 20 October 1946 and later that year was exhibited at the Paris Air Show.

Production was stopped in 1949 after 20 F.25s had been completed. They could not compete in cost against large numbers of surplus military aircraft available at bargain prices following the end of the war, while Fokker required its production capacity to concentrate on the Fokker S.11 Instructor trainer. Only three of the aircraft were flown.

Specifications (Fokker F.25 with O-435-A engine)

References

Further reading

External links

  dutch-aviation.nl

1940s Dutch civil utility aircraft
F 25
Mid-wing aircraft
Single-engined pusher aircraft
Twin-boom aircraft
Aircraft first flown in 1946